David Cathels (1853-1925) was a Church of Scotland minister. He served as Moderator of the General Assembly of the Church of Scotland in 1924.

Life

Ordained 22 February 1882 to Kirkton in the Scottish Borders. Translated and Admitted to Hawick 18 May 1892. 

In 1880 he is listed as the Worshipful Master of a Freemason Lodge.

For most of his life he was minister of Hawick, from around 1885 until death.

In 1924 he succeeded Very Rev George Milligan as Moderator.

He died in the manse at Hawick in June 1925. His position as Moderator was filled by Very Rev John White of South Leith Parish Church.

Family

David Cathels was father to the Reverend Louis Patrick Cathels (d.1939), who was minister of Peterhead.

Publications
see

Ourselves and Our Times (1887)
Christian Manhood (1889)
Landmarks: A Common Riding Sermon (1895)
Honour the King (1897)
The Reformation and John Knox 8 volumes (1905)

References

1925 deaths
20th-century Ministers of the Church of Scotland
Moderators of the General Assembly of the Church of Scotland
Scottish Freemasons
19th-century Ministers of the Church of Scotland